José Antonio García Calvo (born 1 April 1975) is a Spanish retired footballer who played as a central defender.

During his professional career he represented both Madrid clubs, Real and Atlético (but was mainly associated with Valladolid), appearing in 355 La Liga matches over 15 seasons and scoring 12 goals.

Club career
A product of Real Madrid's youth system, Madrid-born García Calvo appeared in six games for the first team as they won the La Liga championship in the 1996–97 season, eventually totalling only 16 during his spell. His first match came on 2 March 1996, in a 5–0 home win against UD Salamanca (Fernando Sanz, another centre-back from the academy, also played his first top-flight match that day); subsequently, he signed with Real Valladolid where he was a regular for four years, scoring his first professional goal in his first year.

Calvo then spent five years in another club from the capital, Atlético Madrid. He was instrumental in the Colchoneros 2002 promotion from the Segunda División, with 35 matches and 11 bookings.

Unable to settle at Atlético in his final two years, García Calvo returned to Valladolid in summer 2006, helping to a return to the top tier after a three-year absence. He was an undisputed starter throughout the following campaign, netting in a 2–2 home draw against Deportivo de La Coruña on 2 September 2007 as the Castile-La Mancha side went on to finally retain their status.

Following recurrent foot problems that ailed him throughout 2008–09, Calvo announced his retirement from the game at 34. One year later, he was appointed his last club's director of football.García Calvo no continuará en el Real Valladolid como director deportivo (García Calvo will not continue in Real Valladolid as sporting director); La Información, 6 July 2011 (in Spanish)

International career
García Calvo earned three caps for the Spanish national team, the first coming on 21 August 2002 against Hungary during a Ferenc Puskás testimonial match (1–1 draw).

Previously, he was picked for the under-21 side that won the 1998 UEFA European Championship.

Honours
ClubReal MadridLa Liga: 1996–97Atlético MadridSegunda División: 2001–02ValladolidSegunda División: 2006–07

InternationalSpain U21'
UEFA European Under-21 Championship: 1998

References

External links
 
 
 

1975 births
Living people
Footballers from Madrid
Spanish footballers
Association football defenders
La Liga players
Segunda División players
Segunda División B players
Real Madrid C footballers
Real Madrid Castilla footballers
Real Madrid CF players
Real Valladolid players
Atlético Madrid footballers
Spain under-21 international footballers
Spain international footballers